This is a list of cover versions by music artists who have recorded one or more songs written and originally recorded by English rock band The Beatles. Many albums have been created in dedication to the group, including film soundtracks, such as I Am Sam (2001) and Across the Universe (2007) and commemorative albums such as Sgt. Pepper Knew My Father (1988) and This Bird Has Flown (2005).

Artists who have covered songs from the solo careers of the Beatles' members John Lennon, George Harrison, Paul McCartney and Ringo Starr are not included, and songs which The Beatles covered are also not included. Non-Beatles songs credited to Lennon–McCartney are also not included.

List

See also
List of songs covered by The Beatles

References

Further reading
Belmo, The Beatles Discovered: Beatles Tribute Albums, Cover Songs, Comedy & Novelty Records, Parody Albums and More! (Beatlology, Inc., 2007), book begins "with a listing of Beatles songs performed by other artists, the narrative chronicles recordings from lesser known talents such as Billy J. Kramer and the Dakotas and Matt Munro to superstars such as Elton John" and provides a "survey of more than 500 tribute albums with complete recording information; reviews of notable tribute albums by artists such as the Billy Preston, the Chipmunks, and the Hollyridge Strings"
For a study of covers of a specific song, see Peter A De Vries, A Comparative Study of Three Cover Versions of the Beatles' Song "Eleanor Rigby" (University of Queensland, 1988).

External links
Covers of Beatles songs and/or songs covered by the Beatles on WhoSampled
Covers of Beatles songs and songs covered by the Beatles on SecondHandSongs
The most complete list of cover versions of Beatles songs

Musical tributes to the Beatles
Beatles
Beatles
Beatles